Ibuprofen, an analgesic and non-steroidal anti-inflammatory drug (NSAID), is sold under many brand-names around the world. The most common are Brufen (its earliest registered trademark), Advil, Motrin, and Nurofen.

List of brands

References

Lists of brands
Nonsteroidal anti-inflammatory drugs